XPress Telecom was a wireless telecommunication operator in Jordan. It has been shut down because of financial problems. It holds a digital trunking radio system license from the country's telecommunication regulatory body, the TRC; the technology used is Motorola's proprietary iDEN technology operated on the SMR-800 frequency band.

Its offering mostly targeted the corporate market with an array of services needed in such sector including; professional radio service (also known as Push-To-Talk or PTT), regular mobile telephony and messaging services along with A-GPS based tracking services and wireless-data services. They do also offer prepaid service for the individual customers.

XPress Jordan ceased trading in 2010.

XPress's sister company Bravo Telecom operates the same system in neighboring Saudi Arabia, one advantage of that is that customers of either network can place international push-to-talk calls, similar service is available between Sprint Nextel iDEN network subscribers and their counterparts in other countries such as Nextel in Mexico and Telus iDEN subscribers in Canada.

See also 
 iDEN Technology explained
 List of mobile network operators

References

External links 
 XPress's official website
 Bravo's official website

Telecommunications companies of Jordan
Defunct companies of Jordan